The 1997 Clásica de Almería was the 12th edition of the Clásica de Almería cycle race and was held on 2 March 1997. The race was won by Massimo Strazzer.

General classification

References

1997
1997 in road cycling
1997 in Spanish sport